Kasamatsu Station is the name of two train stations in Japan:

 Kasamatsu Station (Gifu) (笠松駅)
 Kasamatsu Station (Kyoto) (傘松駅)